Grand Place is a village in the commune La Possession in the French overseas department of La Réunion, an island in the Indian Ocean. The hamlet (fr. îlet = little island) is situated in the Cirque de Mafate, a caldera of the Piton des Neiges volcano, which is part of the Réunion National Park. It is accessible only on foot or by helicopter.

Village structure 

Grand Place is one of the settlements in the Mafate cirque with the largest surface area and stretches on a sloped plane that reaches from 520 m up to ~1000 m in the shadow of Piton Calumet (height 1616 m). Therefore it may be separated into three "districts": 
 Grand Place les Hauts, 
 Grand Place École, 
 Grand Place les Bas aka "Cayenne". 
Nearby, the Rivière des Galets flows northward and drains the caldera.

The îlet's small church Notre Dame de Lourdes is located in Cayenne. The current building had been rebuilt and inaugurated in 1970. The little belltower carries a bell which seems to be cast with the inscription "Jesus, Maria, Joseph" in 1745.

Education 
The first school (and then the only one in Mafate) was erected in Cayenne in 1923, but this building is not more in use although still standing. In 1996 the small elementary school Leonard Thomas was established in Grand Place École. It has a capacity of 10-20 pupils which originate not only from Grand Place itself, but also from nearby hamlets (îlets). The teacher usually stays during the week in a room of the small complex, and there is also a canteen option for the kids to have a warm meal during the lunchbreak.

Notable people 

A basalt statue of Yvrin Pausé (1928-2019), created by sculptor Marco Ah Kiem, was installed in the village in 2016, to honour the mailman of the Mafate mountains. He served from 1951 until 1991 the area by foot and walked about a quanter million kilometers in his duty years. Also the postal sorting center in Le Port bears his name, and he received a medal of merit in 1993 for his accomplishments. Grand Place was his birthplace, where he lived his live and worked, including a grocery store which he operated with his wife since 1960 and a lodge Le Bougainvillier which he opened at age 71.

References

Populated places in Réunion